Brentwood is a locality on the Yorke Peninsula in South Australia. It is on the Yorke Highway, between Minlaton and Hardwicke Bay.

Local Business
The small town is not driven by business, and functions as a residential area for people who work in nearby towns or on local farms, as well as for retirees. The small town is home to a local aluminium fabrication business: MJ Welding and Marine Fabrication

See also
 List of cities and towns in South Australia
Brentwood (disambiguation)

References

Towns in South Australia
Yorke Peninsula